San José is a town and municipality located in the western portion of the Colombian Department of Caldas. It was originally part of Risaralda Municipality until 1997, when it became an independent municipality within the Caldas Department. The municipality is part of the Lower Western District, 67 km from Manizales. Its name derives from the arrival of the founders on the day of Saint Joseph, March 19.

The municipality is divided into 18 minor counties or veredas:
Altomira, La Paz, Los Caimos, El Contento, Tamboral, Arrayanes, El Bosque, Morroazul, La Primavera, La Libertad, La Cienaga, La Estrella, Guaimaral, Vaticano, El Pacifico, La Morelia, Pueblo Rico and Buena Vista.

Tourism

Alto de la Cruz
Mount Buenavista
Monte Contento Changuí
Mounts of Lopez or the Peace
Our Lady of Carmen Temple
Old School of Saint Teresita
Every two years in October, the town celebrates the Myths and Legends holidays.

Borders
 North: Risaralda
 Northeast and east: Risaralda and Belalcázar
 South: Belalcázar
 West: Viterbo

Rivers
La Hermosa
La Mina
Barcelona
La Ángela
Changuí
La Habana
El Guamo

References
 Así es mi Caldas, San José, "San José", page 83 
  San Jose website

Municipalities of Caldas Department